Dynamite! is the second studio album released by Ike & Tina Turner on the Sue Records label in 1962. The album contains their first Grammy nominated song and their second million-selling hit "It's Gonna Work Out Fine."

Recording 
In the midst of their busy touring schedule on the Chitlin' Circuit and in between club residencies in their home base of St. Louis, Ike and Tina recorded new material. Several of the songs were culled from those 1961 and 1962 sessions. The album as features previously released hits from their debut album, The Soul of Ike & Tina Turner,  such as "A Fool In Love" and "I Idolize You." Unlike earlier pressings, the track "Letter From Tina" is heard in its entirety on this album. Ike and Tina recorded a duet, the pop-soul ballad "Won't You Forgive Me." R&B duo Mickey & Sylvia contributed to the record "It's Gonna Work Out Fine" on guitar and vocal.

Release 
Dynamite! was released on Sue Records in May 1962. The album cover features Ike looking towards Tina who is posing with a mink coat posing in a suggestive way that was started to build within her stage act. 

Several singles from the album were successful including the Grammy-nominated, "It's Gonna Work Out Fine" which peaked at No. 2 on the Hot R&B Sides and became their third song to reach the pop chart, reaching No. 14 on the Billboard Hot 100. The follow-up singles all charted on the Billboard Hot 100: "Poor Fool" (Pop No. 38, R&B No. 4), "Tra La La La La" (Pop No. 50, R&B No. 9), and "You Should'a Treated Me Right" (Pop No. 89).

Reissues 
In 1994, the album was reissued on CD on Collectables Records. It was also included in the double CD compilation The Soul of Ike & Tina / Dynamite! released on Stateside Records in 2004. In 2014, Rumble Records released the album in its original format on vinyl.

Track listing
All songs written by Ike Turner, except where indicated.

References

Ike & Tina Turner albums
Sue Records albums
1962 albums